Zhang Gen (born 5 May 1987) is a Chinese footballer currently playing as a midfielder for Jiangxi Beidamen.

Career statistics

Club
.

Notes

References

1987 births
Living people
Chinese footballers
Association football midfielders
China League One players
China League Two players
Chongqing F.C. players
Hebei F.C. players
Jiangsu Yancheng Dingli F.C. players
Jiangxi Beidamen F.C. players